The 1930 Detroit Stars baseball team competed in the Negro National League during the 1930 baseball season. The team compiled a 54–41 record (52-37 against league opponents), had a 24-game winning streak in July and August, won the league's second-half championship, and lost to the St. Louis Stars in a postseason series billed as the "Negro World Series".

The team was owned by John A. Roesink and led by player-manager Bingo DeMoss. The Stars played their home games at Hamtramck Stadium in Hamtramck, Michigan.

In its first season at the new Hamtramck Stadium, the team did poorly at the box office. In August 1930, the team's official scorer, Russell J. Cowans, published an article blaming owner Roesink, a white owner of haberdashery shops, for antagonizing the team's fans by a variety of incidents, including an attempt to have manager DeMoss arrested for protesting Roesink's use of abusive language, refusing to advertise in the city's black newspapers, inviting Ty Cobb to throw out the first pitch at the stadium's dedication, failing to visit any of the numerous fans who were injured in the 1929 Mack Park fire, failing to tender a contract to Turkey Stearnes at the beginning of the season, failing to provide adequate funds for the players' needs while on road trips, and staffing the park with white umpires, white concessionaires and white ticket sellers.

Batting
The team compiled a team batting average of .271, six points lower than the league average of .277.

Center fielder Turkey Stearnes led the team with a .326 batting average and a .566 slugging percentage. Stearnes died in 1979 and was posthumously inducted into the Baseball Hall of Fame in 2000.

Left fielder Wade Johnston compiled a.315 batting average and a .459 slugging percentage. He also led the Negro National League with 10 triples in 1930.

First baseman Ed Rile compiled a .304 batting average and a .506 slugging percentage. He tied for second in the league with nine triples.

Right fielder Crush Holloway compiled a .250 batting average and .346 slugging percentage. Along with Ed Rile, he tied for second in the league with nine triples.

Shortstop Jake Dunn compiled a .283 batting average and .415 slugging percentage.

Pitching
The Stars ranked third in the Negro National League with a .3.89 earned run average (ERA) and sixth in the league with 275 strikeouts.

Andy Cooper, a left-hander from Texas, appeared in 19 games (13 as a starter) and led the team with a 9-6 win–loss record and 3.10 ERA. Cooper died in 1941 and was posthumously inducted into the Baseball Hall of Fame in 2006.

Nelson Dean, a right-hander from Oklahoma, appeared in 19 games (13 as a starter) and compiled a 9–8 record with a 3.71 ERA and 63 strikeouts.

Willie Powell, a right-hander from Alabama, appeared in 20 games (15 as a starter) and compiled a 7–7 record with a 4.60 ERA.

Albert Davis appeared in 18 games (15 as a starter) and compiled a 6–7 record and a 4.58 ERA.

Roster

Game log

References

1930 in sports in Michigan
Negro league baseball seasons
African-American history in Detroit